Isabelle Urquhart (December 9, 1865 – February 7, 1907) was an American contralto and actress, noted for her performances in comic opera and musical comedy. She was "one of the reigning queens of comic opera".

Early life
Urquhart was born in New York City and was of Scottish ancestry. Her father died when she was five years old. At the age of ten, she began to attend a convent school, where she sang in choirs.

When she was fifteen years old, she ran away from the convent school to seek a stage career, but her mother found her after two weeks and sent her back to the school. She ran away again, taking a job as a chorus girl.

Early career 

Urquhart's first theatrical job was as a chorus girl at the Standard Theatre in New York City for $10 a week. She recalled that her first performance was in Gilbert and Sullivan's Patience. Other sources say that her first stage appearance there was in the chorus in Billee Taylor, produced by the Richard D'Oyly Carte and E. E. Rice Opera Companies on February 19, 1891. She soon had a small role in a serio-comedic opera by Charles Brown called Elves and Mermaids. She was in the chorus of another D'Oyly Carte production, the comic opera Claude Duval, the following season.

Augustin Daly's company engaged Urquhart to play utility parts from 1882 to 1883. In this capacity, she performed as Edinge in Giroutte, Mary Ann in The Passing Regiment, and in a production of Needles and Pins. In The Squire, the then seventeen-year-old Urquhart played a 97-year-old woman, but not without some reservations. She spent three successful seasons in London, England, with the H. M. Pitts comedy company, starting in the summer of 1883. Between these, in May 1884, she portrayed Cora Piper in Madame Piper at Wallack's Theatre in New York. In September 1884, as a member of the Bijoux Theatre opera company in New York, she played Venus in a burlesque, Orpheus and Eurydice, at Stetson's Fifth Avenue Theatre. She performed the role of Mars in another burlesque, Ixion in February 1885 at The New York Comedy Theatre.   

In 1886, Urquhart acted in dramas with Lawrence Barrett at the Globe Theatre in Boston, Massachusetts, appearing as Portia in Julius Caesar, Nicol in The King's Pleasure, and Donna Isabella in The Wonder. Other drama roles included Gertrude in Hamlet and Hero in Much Ado About Nothing. However, Rudolph Aronson persuaded her to return to light opera because it paid better, though she stated in an interview, "I prefer legitimate drama to comic opera."  

Urquhart joined the chorus at the Casino Theatre in New York City, soon rising to small parts in comic operas. In the summer of 1885, she sang with Lillian Russell as Ensign Daffodil in Rice's production of Polly. Her first major role was Cerise in the hit Erminie, which ran from 1886 to 1888 at the Casino. As a leading lady in Erminie, she started a fashion trend by foregoing her petticoats "to accentuate her gorgeous figure". Comedian and actor Francis Wilson recalled, "Over this innovation of Urquhart, men raved, and women, taking the hint, became imitators. Petticoats disappeared from female attire. In place of the bulging hourglass type of dress, adored by the Dutch, American women became an anatomy, a slender, clinging thing of beauty. ... This startling change in female attire followed so pat upon the appearance and action of Miss Urquhart that I have ventured to credit her with its origin."

Also at the Casino Theatre, Urquhart performed the role of Pompanoa in The Marquis in September 1887, and Princess Etelka in Nadja in May 1888. She also played Dame Carruthers in Gilbert and Sullivan's The Yeomen of the Guard in October 1888 and was the Princess of Granada in the operetta The Brigands, W. S. Gilbert's translation of Offenbach's Les brigands, in May 1899. In an 1889 revival of Nadja, Urquhart understudied Lillian Russell, filling in for the star as Princess Nadja on April 25 and 26. In February 1890, she performed as Iza in The Grand Duchess of Gerolstein, with Russell in the title role. While with the Casino company, Urquhart also played Papanea in Madelen. In September 1891, Urquhart took on the role of Chloe in a Brooks and Dickson production of Sims and Clay's new operetta, The Merry Duchess, at the Standard Theatre in New York.

Later career
Urquhart appeared in vaudeville in the late 1890s. In 1897, she performed a sketch of her own devising, at the Union Square Theatre, in which she "did little more ... than display her form in a handsome gown to the utmost advantage." The same year, she performed in a show written for her, In Durance Vile, at B. F. Keith's vaudeville theater in Boston. Although she had aged since her time with Casino Theatre company, one critic commented, "She has gained greatly in the quality of her acting, and her performance of the part in the little sketch in which she is making her continuous performance debut is entirely satisfactory to patrons of that form of amusement." 

In November 1900, her Isabelle Urquhart & Co. performed the comedy Even Steven again at B. F. Keith's; she also brought this vaudeville act to Procter's Theatres in September 1903, Keith's in Providence, Rhode Island, in 1903, and Shea's in Buffalo, New York, in 1904. The Providence theater manager wrote in his report, "She never was very strong here, and this engagement is no exception. It is a nice clean act, and it is all right to play it about as often as we do. This is the first time we have had her in more than three years. She falls considerably short of being a headline feature." The Shea's manager opined, "Miss Urquhart is a very good actress and has some fine gowns which show to advantage clothing her graceful figure." In February 1900, Urquhart performed the lead role of Lady Garnett in Cecil Raleigh and Henry Hamilton's drama The Great Ruby at The Boston Theatre in Boston. She then returned to Broadway, performing as Mrs. Challoner in Martha Morton's comedy The Diplomat at the Madison Square Theatre in April 1902. 

In 1906, she played the role of Mrs. Clandon in a production of George Bernard Shaw's You Never Can Tell in Pittsburgh, Pennsylvania. One critic wrote, "Urquhart played the advanced mother with grace and power." She also performed in Broadway revivals of Shaw's comedies Arms and the Man, in April 1906, and How He Lied to Her Husband, in May 1906. The latter was her final role. In May 1914, Leander Richardson wrote in Vanity Fair that Urquhart's "figure was both imposing and beautiful – an Amazonian type; stately, superb. ... Urquhart never rose very high in the profession, for her talents were not greatly out of the ordinary. But in a decorative capacity she was certainly second to none".

Trade cards 
Urquhart was a popular model for cabinet cards that were distributed as a premium with tobacco sales. She was featured on cabinet cards issued by Newsboy and Falk. Around 1888, she posed for trade cards issued by Allen & Ginter for their Dixie, Opera Puff Cigarettes, Our Little Beauties, and Virginia Brights. In 1889, she was included in the actresses trade card series issued by William S. Kimball & Co. to market their cigarettes. 

Also in the 1880s, Urquhart posed for a trade card for W. Duke, Sons & Co., which marketed Duke's Cameo Cigarettes. Duke also included Urquhart in their promotional booklet, Costumes of All Nations. In 1890, Kinney Brothers Tobacco Company issued an Urquhart trade card to promote Sweet Caporal cigarettes. Around the same time, Kinney Brothers issued a colorized trade card featuring Urquhart to promote their Sporting Extra cigarettes.

Personal life 
In 1890, Urquhart lived with her mother and aunt in a New York City apartment that overlooked the Metropolitan Opera House. She married the English actor Guy Standing, eight years her junior, in London in 1893. They divorced six years later. 

In 1906, she lived in New Rochelle, New York. She was stricken with peritonitis on January 21, 1907. Two operations failed to save her, and she died on February 7, 1907, at the Homeopathic Hospital in Rochester, New York, at the age of 41. Her funeral was held at her home in New York City, The Shantee, and she was buried in the family plot at Woodlawn Cemetery.

Gallery

References

Sources
Brown, Thomas Allston. A History of the New York Stage: From the First Performance in 1732 to 1901, Dodd, Mead (1903)

External links

Photographs, New York Public Library 

1865 births
1907 deaths
Actresses from New York City
19th-century American actresses
19th-century American women singers
19th-century American singers
American operatic contraltos
American stage actresses
20th-century actresses
20th-century American women singers
20th-century American singers
Vaudeville performers
Deaths from peritonitis